Battle Township is a township in Beltrami County, Minnesota, United States. The population was 60 as of the 2000 census. Battle Township took its name from the Battle River.

Geography

Unincorporated towns
 Saum at 
(This list is based on USGS data and may include former settlements.)

Adjacent townships
 Shotley Township (northeast)
 Woodrow Township (east)
 Cormant Township (southeast)
 Quiring Township (south)

Demographics
As of the census of 2000, there were 60 people, 22 households, and 13 families residing in the township. The population density was 4.4 people per square mile (1.7/km). There were 29 housing units at an average density of 2.1/sq mi (0.8/km). The racial makeup of the township was 93.33% White and 6.67% Native American.

There were 22 households, out of which 31.8% had children under the age of 18 living with them, 45.5% were married couples living together, 4.5% had a female householder with no husband present, and 40.9% were non-families. 40.9% of all households were made up of individuals, and 22.7% had someone living alone who was 65 years of age or older. The average household size was 2.73 and the average family size was 3.85.

In the township the population was spread out, with 30.0% under the age of 18, 11.7% from 18 to 24, 25.0% from 25 to 44, 23.3% from 45 to 64, and 10.0% who were 65 years of age or older. The median age was 35 years. For every 100 females, there were 140.0 males. For every 100 females age 18 and over, there were 121.1 males.

The median income for a household in the township was $23,750, and the median income for a family was $63,750. Males had a median income of $31,667 versus $19,583 for females. The per capita income for the township was $18,980. There were 26.7% of families and 36.4% of the population living below the poverty line, including 75.0% of under eighteens and 55.6% of those over 64.

References
 United States National Atlas
 United States Census Bureau 2007 TIGER/Line Shapefiles
 United States Board on Geographic Names (GNIS)

Townships in Beltrami County, Minnesota
Townships in Minnesota